The 58th National Film Awards, presented by Directorate of Film Festivals, the organisation set up by Ministry of Information and Broadcasting, India to felicitate the best of Indian Cinema for the year 2010.

The selection process started by announcing the invitation for the awards on 18 March 2011. For feature and non-feature films, all the films certified by Central Board of Film Certification, India between 1 January 2010 and 31 December 2010 were made eligible whereas for the best writing on cinema, all the books and articles as well reviews on Indian cinema published between 1 January 2010 and 31 December 2010 were made eligible for the awards.

Three different committees were instituted in order to judge the various entries for feature film, non-feature film and best writing on cinema sections; headed by J. P. Dutta, for feature films and A. K. Bir along with Ashok Vajpeyi for non-feature films and best writing on cinema sections, respectively. Another committee of five members was also constituted for the Dadasaheb Phalke Award, having included two past Dadasaheb Phalke Award recipient, Shyam Benegal and Adoor Gopalakrishnan.

Each chairperson for feature film, non-feature film and best writing on cinema sections announced the award on 19 May 2011 for their respective sections and award ceremony took place at Vigyan Bhavan, New Delhi with President of India, Pratibha Patil giving away the awards on 9 September 2011.

Awards 

Awards were divided into feature films, non-feature films and books written on Indian cinema.

Lifetime Achievement Award 

The award is given to a prominent personality from the Indian film industry for their contribution.

Juries 

A committee consisting five eminent personalities from Indian film industry was appointed to evaluate the lifetime achievement award, Dadasaheb Phalke Award. Following were the jury members:

 Jury Members

Feature films 

Films made in any Indian language shot on 16 mm, 35 mm or in a wider gauge or digital format but released on a film format or video/digital but certified by the Central Board of Film Certification as a feature film or featurette are eligible for Feature Film section.

Feature films were awarded at All India as well as regional level. For 58th National Film Awards, a Malayalam film, Adaminte Makan Abu won the National Film Award for Best Feature Film; whereas a Tamil film, Aadukalam won the maximum number of awards (6). Following were the awards given in each category:

Juries 

A committee headed by J. P. Dutta was appointed to evaluate the feature films awards. The selection process returned to a Two Tier System of Selection. The Chairperson for the Northern Region was Nirad N. Mohapatra, for the Western Region, Chandraprakash Dwivedi, for South–I Region, Arunoday Sharma, for the Eastern Region, J. F. C. Durai and for South- II Region, Ansu Ranjan Sur. Following were the jury members:

 Jury Members
 J. P. Dutta (Chairperson)Ansu Ranjan SurArunoday SharmaBharat BalaChandraprakash Dwivedi
 G. S. BhaskarJ. F. C. DuraiK. N. T. SastryKeval AroraNirad N. MohapatraPrahlad Kakkar
 Jury Regional : East
 J. F. C. DuraiNirmal DharT. Krishnan UnniPranab DasSuman Haripriya
 Jury Regional : West
 Chandraprakash DwivediSukumar JataniaAijaz KhanRajiv VijayakarPurushottam Berde
 Jury Regional : North
 Nirad N. MohapatraChitraarthM. M. AlexJeetendra SumanManjul Sinha
 Jury Regional : South-I
 Arunoday SharmaK. S. GomatamGnana RajasekaranK. G. GeorgeAkkineni Kutumba Rao
 Jury Regional : South-II
 Ansu Ranjan SurB. S. LingadevaruD. V. Narasa RajuN. Manu ChakravarthyMeenakshi Shedde

All India Award 

Following were the awards given:

Golden Lotus Award 

Official name: Swarna Kamal

All the awardees are awarded with 'Golden Lotus Award (Swarna Kamal)', a certificate and cash prize.

Silver Lotus Award 

Official name: Rajat Kamal

All the awardees are awarded with 'Silver Lotus Award (Rajat Kamal)', a certificate and cash prize.

Regional Awards 

The award is given to best film in the regional languages in India.

Best Feature Film in Each of the Language Other Than Those Specified in the Schedule VIII of the Constitution

Non-Feature Films 

Short Films made in any Indian language and certified by the Central Board of Film Certification as a documentary/newsreel/fiction are eligible for non-feature film section.

Juries 

A committee headed by A. K. Bir was appointed to evaluate the non-feature films awards. Following were the jury members:

 Jury Members
 A. K. Bir (Chairperson)Amlan DattaGautam BenegalKavita JoshiOken AmakchamRajula ShahSourav Sarangi

Golden Lotus Award 

Official name: Swarna Kamal

All the awardees are awarded with 'Golden Lotus Award (Swarna Kamal)', a certificate and cash prize.

Silver Lotus Award 

Official name: Rajat Kamal

All the awardees are awarded with 'Silver Lotus Award (Rajat Kamal)' and cash prize.

Best Writing on Cinema 

The awards aim at encouraging study and appreciation of cinema as an art form and dissemination of information and critical appreciation of this art-form through publication of books, articles, reviews etc.

Juries 

A committee headed by Ashok Vajpeyi was appointed to evaluate the writing on Indian cinema. Following were the jury members:

 Jury Members
 Ashok Vajpeyi (Chairperson)H. N. Narahari RaoVidyarthi Chatterjee

Golden Lotus Award 

Official name: Swarna Kamal

All the awardees are awarded with 'Golden Lotus Award (Swarna Kamal)' and cash prize.

Special Mention 

All the award winners are awarded with Certificate of Merit.

Awards not given 

Following were the awards not given as no film was found to be suitable for the award:

 Best Animated Film
 Best Film on Family Welfare
 Best Feature Film in Manipuri
 Best Feature Film in Oriya
 Best Feature Film in Punjabi
 Best Feature Film in Telugu
 Best Agricultural Film
 Best Historical Reconstruction / Compilation Film
 Best Non-Feature Animation Film
 Best Non-Feature Film Music Direction

Award Ceremony 

58th National Film Award ceremony was held on Friday, 9 September 2011 at Vigyan Bhavan, New Delhi; which is a premier Convention centre of Government of India. Awards were conferred by President of India, Pratibha Patil and ceremony was hosted by actors Mahi Gill and Rajat Kapoor.

With 58th National Film Awards, award certificate and medal went through a makeover. Award certificate layout as well as design was changed to include gold embossed "Ashok Stambh" (Emblem of India) on the A3 size certificate. Swarna Kamal (Golden Lotus) and Rajat Kamal (Silver Lotus) were also redesigned which included the display box for the medals as well.

Ceremony had performances by two of the winners; Suresh Wadkar and Rekha Bhardwaj, who won the award for Best Male Playback Singer and Best Female Playback Singer, respectively. Both sang their respective award-winning songs, "Hey Bhaskara Kshitijavari Ya" from a Marathi film, Mee Sindhutai Sapkal and "Badi Dheere Jali" from a Hindi film, Ishqiya.

References

External links 
 National Film Awards Archives
 Official Page for Directorate of Film Festivals, India

National Film Awards (India) ceremonies
2011 Indian film awards